The following is a list of awards and nominations received by American actor Willem Dafoe.

Dafoe made his film debut in Michael Cimino's Heaven's Gate (1980) before earning his first Academy Award nomination for Oliver Stone's war film Platoon (1986). In 1988 he starred as Jesus Christ in Martin Scorsese's religious epic The Last Temptation of Christ and as an FBI Agent Alan Parker's racial drama Mississippi Burning. He also made appearances in Stone's Born on the Fourth of July (1989), John Waters' Cry-Baby (1990), David Lynch's Wild at Heart (1990), and Anthony Minghella's The English Patient (1996) and Mary Harron's American Psycho (2000).

In 2002, he gained international recognition for his portrayal as Norman Osborn / Green Goblin in Sam Raimi's Spider-Man (2002), further reprising the role in Spider-Man 2 (2004), Spider-Man 3 (2007), and the Marvel Cinematic Universe (MCU) film Spider-Man: No Way Home (2021). He also became known for his appearances in Wes Anderson films including, The Life Aquatic with Steve Zissou (2004), Fantastic Mr. Fox (2009), The Grand Budapest Hotel (2014) and The French Dispatch (2021). In the 21st century he has earned critical acclaim and awards nominations for his performances in Sean Baker's The Florida Project (2017), Julian Schnabel's At Eternity's Gate (2018), and Robert Eggers' The Lighthouse (2019).

He has earned many awards and nominations for his performances including four Academy Award nominations, a British Academy Film Award nomination, three Golden Globe Award nominations, and four Screen Actors Guild Awards nominations.

Major associations

Academy Awards

British Academy Film Awards

Critics' Choice Movie Awards

Golden Globe Awards

Independent Spirit Awards

Screen Actors Guild Awards

Other awards and nominations

AACTA Awards

Alliance of Women Film Journalists

Austin Film Critics Association

Berlin International Film Festival

Bodil Awards

Boston Society of Film Critics

Chicago Film Critics Association

Columbus Film Critics Association Awards

Critics' Choice Super Awards

Dallas–Fort Worth Film Critics Association

Detroit Film Critics Society

Fantasporto's International Fantasy Film Award

Florida Film Critics Circle

Gotham Awards

Georgia Film Critics Association Awards

Golden Raspberry Awards

Golden Schmoes Awards

Los Angeles Film Critics Association

London Film Critics' Circle

MTV Movie & TV Awards

National Academy of Video Game Trade Reviewers

National Board of Review

National Society of Film Critics

New York Film Critics Circle

New York Film Critics Online

Online Film Critics Society

Robert Awards

San Diego Film Critics Society

San Francisco Film Critics Circle

Sant Jordi Awards

Satellite Awards

Seattle Film Critics Society

Spike Video Game Awards

St. Louis Film Critics Association

Taron Awards

Toronto Film Critics Association

University of Wisconsin-Milwaukee

Vancouver Film Critics Circle

Venice Film Festival

Washington D.C. Area Film Critics Association

References

External links
 

Dafoe, Willem